Parves is a former commune in the Ain department in eastern France. On 1 January 2016, it was merged into the new commune Parves-et-Nattages.

Population

See also
Communes of the Ain department

References

Former communes of Ain
Ain communes articles needing translation from French Wikipedia
Populated places disestablished in 2016